Spakenburg is a Dutch village north of Bunschoten. Spakenburg is formally called Bunschoten-Spakenburg since its fusion with Bunschoten. The village lies south of the IJsselmeer in the municipality Bunschoten, Utrecht. It is one of the few places left in the Netherlands where some women still wear local traditional clothes.

In the 20th century, the two villages have grown quickly, and since about 1965 they form one single town, officially named Bunschoten.

The football teams IJsselmeervogels and SV Spakenburg are located there, and contest one of the most popular local rivalries in Dutch amateur football. 
Also the basketball team BC Shooters is located there.

On the last two Wednesday in July and the first two Wednesday of August, there is an event in Spakenburg called the Spakenburgse Dagen (Spakenburg days), in which people dress up in local traditional clothing and dance and generally celebrate. There is a roundabout, a clown for the children, a big market and music.

Bunschoten
Populated places in Utrecht (province)